Daxu is a town in Jianghua Yao Autonomous County, Hunan Province, China. , it administers one residential community and the following 29 villages:
Wenhai Village
Niejia Village
Yuantou Village
Goubian Village
Dabuwan Village
Huangting Village
Muyuanjing Village
Baojing Village
Shuli Village
Lianhua Village
Liangyuan Village
Xiling Village
Da Village
Xingren Village
Wenming Village
Heping Village
Juntian Village
Datang Village
Gaozhai Village
Caohuang Village
Xinhe Village
Liangchahe Village
Dongchonghe Village
Zhuangjia Village
Jingbianying Village
Hengjiang Village
Longmen Village
Zhulin Village
Changshan Village

References

Jianghua Yao Autonomous County
Towns of Hunan